This article contains a list of fossil-bearing stratigraphic units in the state of Missouri, U.S.

Sites

See also

 Paleontology in Missouri

References

 

Missouri
Stratigraphic units
Stratigraphy of Missouri
Missouri geography-related lists
United States geology-related lists